Rebecca Renee Olstead (born June 18, 1989) is an American actress and singer. Active since childhood as an actress, she is best known for her roles on the CBS sitcom Still Standing and on the ABC Family drama The Secret Life of the American Teenager as Madison Cooperstein. In addition, she has recorded four studio albums, primarily of jazz music.

Early life
Olstead was born in Kingwood, Texas, to Christopher Eric Olstead and Rebecca Lynn Jeffries. Olstead is of Norwegian ancestry. She also attended Centre Stage theatrical school and is mentioned on their website's list of alumni.

Career 
As a child actress, she made films and commercials from age eight onwards. From 2002 to 2006, she appeared in the TV sitcom Still Standing as middle sister Lauren Miller. Olstead was presented with the Young Artist Award for Best Performance in a TV Series (Comedy) - Supporting Young Actress for Still Standing in 2002. She also had a small part in the 2004 film 13 Going on 30. She co-starred in the ABC Family series The Secret Life of the American Teenager, about fifteen-year-old Amy Juergens's struggle through her unexpected pregnancy and how it affected her peers. Olstead played the character Madison Cooperstein, one of Amy's best friends.

In 2004, Olstead released a self-titled album of jazz songs and pop standards for Warner Bros. Records to good reviews. Since her previous releases had limited distribution, this album was considered her official debut. She subsequently performed in Berlin during the Live 8 concert on July 2, 2005.

Olstead also recorded with trumpeter Chris Botti on his 2005 album To Love Again: The Duets and appeared on the 2006 DVD Chris Botti Live with Orchestra and Special Guests. Her singing style is influenced by such great jazz vocalists as Ella Fitzgerald and Sarah Vaughan. Reportedly, her musical talent was discovered by composer David Foster, who produced her 2004 album. She later performed with him on The Oprah Winfrey Show.

A follow-up album entitled Skylark, also produced by Foster, was originally announced for release in 2005, but it was subsequently pushed back several times, with release dates in the summer of 2006 and early 2007 being mentioned on online retailers such as Amazon.com. It was then scheduled for a June 2008 release, but was delayed once again. It was finally released on January 27, 2009, nearly four years after it was originally announced.

Olstead most recently starred as Kaitlan in the 2013 supernatural thriller The Midnight Game and as Jess Felton in the 2014 technology-themed thriller film Unfriended.

On November 30, 2020, Renee announced that she was launching an Onlyfans page. Her introductory subscription fee was set at $9.99 per month. She was the Penthouse (magazine) Pet of the Month in January 2023.

Personal life
Renee was married to pianist Tommy King, and legally took his last name. The two divorced in 2020. As Renee King, she was crowned Ms. West Coast at the Miss West Coast pageant in 2016.

Olstead is a vegan. She appeared in a PETA ad, Fish Are Friends Not Food, urging her fans to become vegan themselves. In 2012, Olstead joined PETA's campaign to free the elephant Mali from captivity at the Manila Zoological and Botanical Garden, where she has been alone for the last three decades.

On September 14, 2011, as the result of a criminal complaint initially made by actress Scarlett Johansson, the FBI announced it was investigating the alleged hacking of celebrity cellphone and email accounts and the dissemination of explicit nude photographs of Johansson and approximately 50 other celebrities, including Olstead. As a result of the investigation, 35-year-old Christopher Chaney of Jacksonville, Florida, was arrested in October 2011. During the trial, Olstead testified that she attempted suicide after the nude photographs were leaked, adding that she had never before considered suicide before the hacking. Chaney was sentenced to 10 years in prison in December 2012.

Discography

List of studio albums, with selected chart positions

Singles

Other charted songs

Filmography

Film

Television

References

External links

 

1989 births
20th-century American actresses
21st-century American actresses
Actresses from Houston
American child actresses
American child singers
American women jazz singers
American jazz singers
American people of Norwegian descent
American television actresses
Living people
Musicians from Houston
Warner Records artists
21st-century American women singers
People from Kingwood, Texas
21st-century American singers
Jazz musicians from Texas
OnlyFans creators